Tyler Bates (born June 5, 1965) is an American musician, producer, and composer for film, television, and video game scores. Much of his work is in the action and horror film genres, with films like Dawn of the Dead, 300, Sucker Punch, Halloween I and II, and the John Wick franchise. He has collaborated with directors like Zack Snyder, Rob Zombie, Neil Marshall, William Friedkin, Scott Derrickson, James Gunn, Chad Stahelski and David Leitch. In addition, he is also the former lead guitarist of the American rock band Marilyn Manson, and produced its albums The Pale Emperor and Heaven Upside Down. He's currently Jerry Cantrell‘s touring/studio member.

Biography

Early life and film scoring 

Bates was born on June 5, 1965, in Los Angeles, California. Growing up in Chicago, he relocated to Los Angeles in 1993 to pursue a career in music. He began his career in the 1990s scoring low-budget films like Tammy and the T-Rex, The Last Time I Committed Suicide, and Denial. In the meantime, he was a member of the alternative rock Pet alongside Lisa Papineau; the band released their eponymous debut in 1996. His breakthrough into the mainstream arguably came in the early 2000s, when he worked on higher-profile projects like Get Carter, Half Past Dead, and Baadasssss! The 2004 remake of Dawn of the Dead was significant, as he would maintain long-term collaborations with its director Zack Snyder, and writer James Gunn.

Bates scored four of director Rob Zombie's films, beginning with 2005's The Devil's Rejects. For Zombie's remake of Halloween and its subsequent sequel, Bates adapted John Carpenter's original themes and motifs in order to fit the darker, grittier, and more contemporary atmosphere of the films. It was around 2007 that Bates began working regularly on big-budget, blockbuster films; including 300, Doomsday, The Day the Earth Stood Still, Sucker Punch, and Conan the Barbarian. This did not, however, dissuade him from composing scores to smaller, independent films like The Way, Killer Joe, The Sacrament, and Flight 7500.

The soundtrack for 300 was controversial due to its heavy borrowing of themes from film scores by Elliot Goldenthal, amongst others. On August 3, 2007, Warner Bros. Pictures acknowledged this in an official statement. The matter was settled amicably with the soundtrack credits being subsequently described as adapted from material by Elliot Goldenthal.

Bates composed the score for Guardians of the Galaxy in 2014. Having worked with James Gunn in the past, Bates had a good idea on how Gunn wanted things done. Before any of the cinematography actually started, Gunn had Bates write several themes prior to shooting so the scene could be matched to the music instead of the score being created to fit the scene. This required a fair bit of cooperation between Bates and Gunn in advance since these scores would not only be the final piece, instead of a temporary filler acting as a placeholder, but they also influenced the actual performance of everyone on set. This amount of work and effort required a massive undertaking by both Bates and his team. For 4 months, they clocked upwards of 100-hour work weeks to produce this finished product. After all the work, they had a total of 29 different soundtracks giving a combined total of 64:34 of music. "At least half the cues in the movie have more than 500 tracks of audio," Bates was quoted in an interview with Melinda Newman on HitFix. This was a result of there being orchestral passages that were doubled or tripled, choirs, overdubs, and other instrumentals.

That same year, Bates composed the score to the stylish neo-noir action film John Wick, collaborating with Joel J. Richard and Marilyn Manson. The film proved a surprise critical and financial success, and Bates returned to score its 2017 sequel, and also its third installment. He re-teamed with that film's co-director David Leitch to score a spiritual successor, the Cold War-era spy thriller Atomic Blonde.

Video game scoring 

Bates composed the soundtrack for the PlayStation 3 games God of War: Ascension and Army of Two: The 40th Day, as well as the PlayStation 4 game Killzone: Shadow Fall. Most recently he composed for the largest first-person shooter app in the world, China's Crossfire.

Other projects 
In 2014, Bates co-wrote and produced Marilyn Manson's record The Pale Emperor. The album debuted at number 8 on the Billboard 200, while the single "Deep Six" went on to chart higher than any other single by Marilyn Manson on Billboard's Mainstream Rock Chart. Bates joined the band in 2015 as the lead guitarist for The Hell Not Hallelujah Tour. The album's song "Cupid Carries a Gun" was used as the opening title music of the TV show Salem, and Bates composed the show's score. In April 2015 he left Marilyn Manson  to resume film work.

In October 2015, during a Q&A with Marilyn Manson at the Grammy Museum, Manson announced that he and Tyler were working on new music together again. In 2015 Loudwire listed "The Mephistopheles Of Los Angeles" No. 1 best rock track and Rolling Stone included The Pale Emperor in its Top 50 list of the best albums of 2015.
He returned as the lead guitarist during the tour with Slipknot in July 2016.
  In 2017, they once again joined forces in the studio for the follow-up Heaven Upside Down with a world tour kicking off July 20, in Budapest, playing more than 100 shows around the world. In January 2018, Tyler announced via Twitter that he left the band and returned to his studio to work exclusively on film and television.

Tyler composed the song, "Monsters After Dark" for the night Halloween mode of the ride GOTG: Mission Breakout!.

In 2021, Bates co-produced and played strings, percussion and guitar on Jerry Cantrell's album Brighten.

Discography

Film scores

Television scores

Videogame soundtracks

Own work
Roseland with Azam Ali

with Marilyn Manson
The Pale Emperor (2015)
Heaven Upside Down (2017)

with Pet
 Pet (1996) (guitar, bass, backing vocals, production)

with Bush

 The Kingdom (2020) (songwriting, production)

with Jerry Cantrell

 Brighten (2021) (strings, percussion, guitar, production)

References

External links
Tyler Bates' Website (includes samples of music and many video clips from movies worked on)

Tyler Bates Interview on KCRW featuring Watchmen Soundtrack
Tyler Bates being interviewed at the Grammy Museum
Shock Till you Drop Exclusive Interview
Tyler Bate Interview at www.reviewgraveard.com

1965 births
American film score composers
Living people
American male film score composers
Marilyn Manson (band) members
Musicians from Los Angeles
Film people from Los Angeles
Video game composers
Varèse Sarabande Records artists
La-La Land Records artists
American rock guitarists
Alternative rock guitarists
Guitarists from California